Edin Bašić (born 4 May 1979 in Zavidovići) is a Bosnian former handball player.

Early career in Bosnia
The right-handed centre back first played for Borac Travnik. With the club he won the domestic championship and cup. In 1998–99 he played his first EHF Champions League season.

Croatia
Soon due to his good performances he caught the eye of Croatian club Zamet Autotrans from Rijeka in 1999. 

Bašić quickly established himself as a vital player for the club.
He was at the club for two years finishing seventh in the league during his first season and fourth during his second season. 
RK Zamet reached the Croatian Handball Cup final twice during the time Bašić played for them. He also played the EHF City Cup and EHF Cup Winners' Cup with Zamet.

Switzerland
In 2001 he moved to TV Endingen in Switzerland. He stayed at the club for two years and he then moved to TV Suhr in 2003. 

In 2007 he moved to GC Amicitia Zurich. With the club he won the domestic championship twice and the Swiss cup once.

Chambéry
In 2009 Edin Bašić moved to Chambéry Savoie Handball.

In 2015-16 season Bašić and his club reached the semi-final of the EHF Cup where they lost to Frisch Auf Göppingen and BM Granollers.

Honours
Borac Travnik
BIH First League 
Winners (1): 1997-98
BIH Cup
Winners (1): 1997

Zamet Autotrans
Croatian Cup
Runner-up (2): 2000, 2001

Zurich
Swiss League
Winner (2): 2007-08, 2008-09
Swiss Cup
Winner (1): 2009
Swiss Super Cup
Winner (1): 2009

Chambéry
LNH Division 1
Runner-up (3): 2009-10, 2010-11, 2011-12, 
Coupe de France
Runner-up (2): 2011, 2014
Coupe de la Ligue
Runner-up (1): 2011
Trophée des champions
Winner (1): 2013
Runner-up (3): 2010, 2011, 2012

Individual
Topscorer of the NLA 2004-05 and 2005-06
6. Place in the overall topscorers in the NLA (1807 goals in 261 games)
Best left back player of the NLA 2006-07, and 2008-09
Best foreigners of LNH 2010-11
Best Playmaker of LNH 2010-11, 2011-12 and 2012-13

References

External links
European Profile 
Club profile

1979 births
Living people
Bosnia and Herzegovina male handball players
Bosnia and Herzegovina expatriate sportspeople in Croatia
People from Zavidovići
RK Zamet players